

The following properties are listed on the National Register of Historic Places in North Philadelphia.

This is intended to be a complete list of the properties and districts on the National Register of Historic Places in North Philadelphia, Pennsylvania, United States. The locations of National Register properties and districts for which the latitude and longitude coordinates are included below, may be seen in an online map.

There are 599 properties and districts listed on the National Register of Historic Places in Philadelphia, including 67 National Historic Landmarks. North Philadelphia includes 167 of these properties and districts, of which 17 are National Historic Landmarks; the city's remaining properties and districts are listed elsewhere. Two sites are split between North Philadelphia and other parts of the city, and are thus included on multiple lists. Two other properties in North Philadelphia were once listed but have been removed.

Current listings

|}

Former listings

|}

See also

 List of National Historic Landmarks in Philadelphia
 National Register of Historic Places listings in Philadelphia, Pennsylvania

References

North Philadelphia
North Philadelphia